Muttrupulliyaa is a Sri Lankan film about four individuals of Tamil descent living in Sri Lanka after the end of the Sri Lankan Civil War in 2009. This is the first film from Sri Lanka to describe this period

The story of Muttrupulliyaa  is told through a former female Tamil tiger rebel living in Jaffna with her three children and her husband missing after he surrendered to the Sri Lankan army,  a historian living in the Vanni; an environmental activist from Colombo and a young journalist from Chennai who travels to Sri Lanka.
 
The production team had to shoot undercover in Sri Lanka, hiding their real identities because of the risks.. Despite these precautions, some of the film team were arrested or forced into hiding.

Muttrupulliyaa premiered at the Jaffna film festival.

Censorship
Muttrupulliyaa  was allowed to be screened in Sri Lanka and was approved by the Public Performance Board of Sri Lanka.

Muttrupulliyaa  was banned in India by the censor board as it would damage Indo-Sri Lanka relations. The ban was later lifted by the  Film Certification Appellate Tribunal.  However, the filmmaker had to morph the Liberation Tigers of Tamil Eelam flags, cut out photographs of its slain leaders and state that the film was a work of fiction inspired by real events.

References

External links
 Sri Lanka Brief, Ban Revoked: Sherine Xavier’s Film a PR Exercise for LTTE says Chennai Film Board, 3 March 2016
 The Hindu, Tribunal revokes ban on Sri Lankan docu-drama, 3 March 2016
 Rediff News, Militarisation is a problem in the Tamil areas in Lanka, 25 May 2016
 Hindustan Times, Indian censors more worried about Sri Lankan film than Lanka’s own, 8 March 2016
 Ottran Cheithi, "முற்றுப்புள்ளியா?" ஈழ திரைப்படத்தின் தணிக்கையும், இன்னல்களும் பற்றிய பத்திரிக்கையாளர்கள் சந்திப்பு – காணொளி, 24 May 2016
 One India-Tamil,  இலங்கை தமிழர் அவலத்தை சொல்லும் முற்றுப்புள்ளியா திரைப்படம், 24 May 2016
 Tamil Diaspora, Mutrupulliya Eelam Tamil Movie Press Meet on Film Certification Difficulties, 30 May 2016
 Ceylon News, Scars of Tomorrow – ‘Muttruppulliya’ to be screened in London, 30 May 2016
 Minnambalam, கண்ணகியும் காளியும்தான் எம் பெண்களின் கவுன்சிலிங், 2 June 2016
 Minnambalam, கண்ணகியும் காளியும்தான் எம் பெண்களின் கவுன்சிலிங் - தொடர்ச்சி!, 2 June 2016
 Deccan Chronicle, Poovarasi awards presented to literary, film personalities, 8 June 2016
 Times, Now showing- Muttrupulliyaa...?, 9 June 2016

Films set in Sri Lanka (1948–present)